Sayamia germaini is a species of freshwater crabs, now moved from the Parathelphusidae to the subfamily Parathelphusinae, found in Thailand, Cambodia and southern Vietnam.  This crab is considered an alien invasive species to Taiwan and is included on the list of least concern arthropods.

References

External links

Freshwater Crab Information Web: Sayamia germaini (retrieved 19 August 2017)

Gecarcinucidae
Freshwater crustaceans of Asia
Crustaceans described in 1902